Chiloglanis disneyi is a species of upside-down catfish endemic to Cameroon where it is found in the Mungo and Manyu River basins.  It may also occur in the Cross River basin of Nigeria.  This species grows to a length of  SL.

References

External links 

disneyi
Freshwater fish of Africa
Fish of Cameroon
Endemic fauna of Cameroon
Fish described in 1974